The Sonisphere Festival was a touring rock music festival which took place across Europe between the months of June and August. The festival was owned by John Jackson and Kilimanjaro Live. It was jointly promoted by K2 and Kilimanjaro Live. It hosted heavy metal bands such as Iron Maiden, Metallica, Mötley Crüe, Slayer, Judas Priest, Megadeth, Avenged Sevenfold and BABYMETAL (the latter group would make their UK debut at the 2014 event).

The festival has not taken place in the UK since 2014. Stuart Galbraith, CEO of Kilimanjaro Live, revealed in 2018 that Sonisphere will not return to the UK, due to financial issues.

Event history 
The idea for Sonisphere was first conceived by John Jackson in the late 90s. Jackson chose the name Sonisphere, from a combination of Sonic and Sphere. In 2008 Stuart Galbraith had formed business partnership with AEG Live called Kilimanjaro Live. John Jackson approached Stuart Galbraith with the idea of a pan-world touring festival that aligned with Kilimanjaro Live's plan for a UK festival. John Jackson is the Creator and Director of Sonisphere and Galbraith the Producer.

The first run of festivals ran throughout the summer of 2009 at six venues, returning in 2010 and 2011 with 11 venues.

Plans for future festivals consist of increasing the number of festivals, making the event global rather than local to Europe, expanding the UK event into a 3-day festival, and increasing the UK capacity from 40,000 to 60,000 attendees.

Sonisphere 2009 
The 2009 Sonisphere festival tour was made up of six one-day festivals across Europe and plenty of slurry whilst in an NVZ with a seventh festival in England spanning two days. The festival had a core group of bands that played each of the six dates with numerous extra bands added to each date individually. The locations for the 2009 festivals include Goffert Park, Nijmegen, Netherlands; Hockenheimring, Germany; The Forum, Barcelona, Spain; Folkets Park, Hultsfred, Sweden; Kirjurinluoto, Pori, Finland; and Knebworth House, Knebworth, England. Metallica were the main headliners for each of the 2009 Sonisphere Festivals.

Netherlands 
The Dutch edition of the Sonisphere Festival took place on Saturday 20 June 2009 at Goffertpark in Nijmegen.

 Down
 Kamelot
 Korn
 Lamb of God
 Metallica
 Pendulum
 Slipknot
 Blaas Of Glory

Mastodon could not make it to Sonisphere due to scheduling issues. This was announced at Sonisphere itself, although some heard the news whilst traveling.

The Sword cancelled their show a few days before Sonisphere began.

Germany 
The German edition of the Sonisphere Festival took place on Saturday 4 July 2009 at Hockenheimring with Metallica as headliners.
 Anthrax
 Die Toten Hosen
 Down
 In Extremo
 Lamb of God
 Mastodon
 Metallica
 The Prodigy

Spain 
The Spanish edition of the Sonisphere Festival took place on Saturday 11 July 2009 at The Forum, Barcelona with headliners Metallica.
 Down
 Gojira
 Lamb of God
 Machine Head
 Mastodon
 Metallica
 Slipknot
 Soziedad Alkoholika
 The Eyes
 Blaas Of Glory

Sweden 

The Swedish edition of the Sonisphere Festival took place on Saturday 18 July 2009 at Folkets Park, Hultsfred with Metallica as headliners.
 Adept
 Conspiracy
 Cradle of Filth
 Dead by April
 Lamb of God
 Machine Head
 Mastodon
 Meshuggah
 Metallica
 Primal Scream
 The (International) Noise Conspiracy
 The Cult
 The Hives

Finland 

The Finnish edition of the Sonisphere Festival took place on Saturday 25 July 2009 at Kirjurinluoto Arena, Pori with Metallica as headliners.
 Diablo
 Lamb of God
 Linkin Park
 Los Bastardos Finlandeses
 Machine Head
 Mastodon
 Metallica
 Saxon
 Turisas
 Blaas Of Glory

Machine Head were forced to cut their set short, due to lead guitarist Phil Demmel collapsing on stage.

England 
The British edition of the Sonisphere Festival took place over two days, on Saturday 1 and Sunday 2 August 2009, at Knebworth House, Knebworth with headliners Linkin Park (Saturday) and Metallica (Sunday). The festival featured four stages of music over the weekend, with the main two being staggered staging, the others being within the Bohemia village. The Bohemia stage (the third of four stages) was an undercover stage and was able to continue past the sound curfews placed upon the main stages. This was The Rev's final live performance as Avenged Sevenfold's drummer before his death in December 2009. It was also the last European appearance of Ronnie James Dio before he died of stomach cancer in May 2010.

 Avenged Sevenfold played their final concert with The Rev before his passing on December 28, 2009. The band's final song together was Almost Easy. 
Dead by Sunrise appeared on the Apollo Stage on the Saturday night as part of Linkin Park's encore.
 Coheed and Cambria were late arriving, due to them missing their ferry and as such were moved onto the Bohemia stage to play a later slot originally intended for the band FACT. As such, FACT played the Apollo stage.
 Lamb of God's guitarist Mark Morton missed the band's slot on 2 August as his wife was due to give birth around that time. Unearth's Buz McGrath filled in for him for the band's show at Sonisphere UK.
 Nine Inch Nails performance was said to be their last in Europe as they were set to stop touring at the end of that tour after 20 years. Ultimately the resumed touring, returning to the UK in 2013 at Reading and Leeds festivals and playing several dates in the UK in May 2014.
 Thunder played their last set as well after 20 years of performing.
 Anthrax played what was billed as a one-off show with former vocalist John Bush as the originally intended vocalist, Dan Nelson, was no longer part of the band.
 Machine Head pulled out when Limp Bizkit's addition bumped them down the bill; however, they did return to play the fourth slot on the Apollo stage as Special Guests.
 Frank Turner pulled out for undisclosed reasons, though he has claimed to fans that he was forced to choose between this festival and Leeds and Reading festivals, ultimately choosing the latter.
 Fear Factory cancelled tour dates for what they claimed to be recording of a new album, but was ultimately found out to be legal disputes over the use of the name Fear Factory.
 Thin Lizzy pulled out as the band parted ways with guitarist-vocalist John Sykes.
 Dirty Little Rabbits pulled out before the festival due to their drummer suffering from exhaustion after months of touring with Slipknot.
 The Ataris pulled out after one of their members contracted swine flu.

Sonisphere 2010
The Sonisphere 2010 tour visited eleven locations around Europe between 16 June and 8 August 2010. The locations for Sonisphere 2010 were Poland, Switzerland, Czech Republic, Bulgaria, Greece, Romania, Turkey, Spain, United Kingdom, Sweden and Finland. Unlike in 2009, there was not a core group of headliners performing all dates. The headliners for 2010 were Iron Maiden, Metallica and Rammstein.

Poland
Warsaw, Poland was the host city for the first of the 2010 festivals; that was first announced on 9 December 2009. The 2010 Sonisphere in Poland took place on 16 June 2010. Metallica, Megadeth, Slayer and Anthrax, bands which make up the big four of thrash metal, played together for the first time.
 Anthrax
 Behemoth
 Frontside
 Megadeth
 Metallica
 Slayer

Switzerland
Switzerland was the second nation to host the Sonisphere festival in 2010 with the event taking place at Degenaupark in Jonschwil on 18 June 2010.
 3 Inches of Blood
 Airbourne
 Alice in Chains
 Amon Amarth
 Anthrax
 As I Lay Dying
 Atreyu
 Blaas Of Glory
 Bullet for My Valentine
 Dear Superstar
 DevilDriver
 Hellyeah
 Mastodon
 Megadeth
 Metallica
 Motörhead
 Overkill
 Rise Against
 Slayer
 Smoke Blow
 Stone Sour
 Volbeat

Czech Republic
Czech Republic hosted the festival in Milovice on 19 June 2010; this was also a one-day festival. Metallica headlined this event.
 Alice in Chains
 Anthrax
 DevilDriver
 Fear Factory
 Megadeth
 Metallica
 Panic Cell 
 Rise Against
 Slayer
 Stone Sour
 Therapy?
 Volbeat

Bulgaria
Bulgaria held its first Sonisphere over two days in Sofia on 22 and 23 June 2010. The venue was the Vasil Levski National Stadium.

Day 1 – Tuesday 22 June
 Anthrax
 Megadeth
 Metallica
 Slayer
Day 2 – Wednesday 23 June
 Alice in Chains
 Manowar
 Rammstein
 Stone Sour

This concert was also broadcast live around the world in movie theaters as part of the Big Four Tour. This was the first time in their history that all four bands played together on one stage, performing the Diamond Head song "Am I Evil?".

Greece
The Sonisphere festival in Greece was held on 24 June 2010 at Terra Vibe Park in Athens in front of 30,000 people.

 Anthrax
 Bullet for My Valentine
 Megadeth
 Metallica
 Slayer
 Stone Sour
 Suicidal Angels

Romania
Romania held the Sonisphere festival from 25 to 27 June 2010 in Bucharest at Romexpo.

Day 1 – Friday 25 June
 Accept
 Manowar
 Orphaned Land
 Paradise Lost
 Volbeat
Day 2 – Saturday 26 June
 Anthrax
 Megadeth
 Metallica
 Slayer
 Vița de Vie
Day 3 – Sunday 27 June
 Alice in Chains
 Anathema
 Rammstein
 Stone Sour

Turkey
Turkey held the Sonisphere festival at the same time as Romania: 25 to 27 June 2010. This part of Sonisphere was at the BJK İnönü Stadium in Istanbul. Akbank sponsored the event.

Day 1 – Friday 25 June
 Alice in Chains
 Black Tooth
 Pentagram
 Rammstein
 Stone Sour
Day 2 – Saturday 26 June
 Accept
 Hayko Cepkin
 Manowar
 Volbeat
Day 3 – Sunday 27 June
 Anthrax
 Megadeth
 Metallica
 Slayer

The Big Four were on the stage one after another, but did not play altogether.

This was the first time Rammstein and Anthrax came to Turkey.

The bass player of Manowar, Joey DeMaio, made a speech to the audience in Turkish.

Spain
Spain hosted Sonisphere on 9 and 10 July 2010, at Getafe Open Air in Madrid.

Day 1 – Friday 9 July
 Anathema
 Bullet for My Valentine
 Faith No More
 Porcupine Tree
 Saxon
 Slayer
 Suicidal Tendencies
 Volbeat
 W.A.S.P.
Day 2 – Saturday 10 July
 Alice in Chains
 Annihilator
 Coheed and Cambria
 Deftones
 Megadeth
 Meshuggah
 Rammstein
 Soulfly

United Kingdom
Sonisphere arrived in the UK for a three-day festival, taking place at Knebworth House between Friday 30 July – Sunday 1 August. Music included a 'Rocky Horror Show theme with Alice Cooper, and headliners Iron Maiden and Rammstein.

Day 1 – Friday 30 July
 65daysofstatic
 Alice Cooper
 And So I Watch You from Afar
 Bigelf
 Blaas Of Glory
 Black Spiders
 Chrome Hoof
 Deaf Havana
 Delain
 Europe
 Fei Comodo
 Gary Numan
 Hawk Eyes
 Karma to Burn
 Lower Than Atlantis
 Sylosis
 Terrorvision
 Throats
 Turisas
 Winnebago Deal

Day 2 – Saturday 31 July
 Anthrax
 Apocalyptica
 Audrey Horne
 Blaas Of Glory
 Corey Taylor
 earthtone9
 Enforcer
 Evile
 Family Force 5
 Fear Factory
 Feeder
 Gallows
 Good Charlotte
 Heaven's Basement
 InMe
 Katatonia
 Lacuna Coil
 Little Fish
 Mötley Crüe
 Outasight
 Papa Roach
 Placebo
 Polar Bear Club
 RSJ
 Rammstein
 Sabaton
 Sick of It All
 Skunk Anansie
 Soulfly
 Therapy?
 Turbowolf
 Young Legionnaire

Day 3 – Sunday 1 August
 Alice in Chains
 Army of Freshmen
 Blaas Of Glory
 Bring Me the Horizon
 CKY
 Dir En Grey
 Fightstar
 Funeral for a Friend
 Henry Rollins
 Iggy and the Stooges
 Iron Maiden
 Karnivool
 Kylesa
 Love Amongst Ruin
 Madina Lake
 Pendulum
 Rise to Remain
 Sacred Mother Tongue
 Skindred
 Slaves to Gravity
 Slayer
 Sweet Savage
 The Cult
 The Defiled
 The Eighties Matchbox B-Line Disaster
 The Union
 The Xcerts

 Band dropouts 
 Outcry Collective pulled out due to the band breaking up.
 Municipal Waste pulled out due to exhaustion and injury.

Sweden

Sweden hosted Sonisphere in Stockholm on 7 August 2010 for a one-day festival. Iron Maiden announced via their official website that the band would headline the Swedish event. The following bands performed at the event. Heaven & Hell cancelled due to Ronnie James Dio's illness and later death.

 Alice Cooper
 Anthrax
 HammerFall
 Iggy and the Stooges
 Imperial State Electric
 Iron Maiden
 Mötley Crüe
 Slayer
 Warrior Soul

Finland
Sonisphere finished its tour in Finland, where tickets sold out in 2009. It was held on 7 and 8 August 2010, at Kirjurinluoto Arena Pori. Iron Maiden and HIM headlined the event.

A freak storm hit Sonisphere in Finland on Sunday 8 August 2010, causing severe damage to the second stage, rendering the stage unsafe and unusable. Two people were seriously injured and one died in hospital. The Heaven & Hell show was cancelled before the beginning of the festival due to Ronnie James Dio's health issues. He died on 16 May 2010.

Day 1 – Saturday 7 August
 Alice in Chains
 Apocalyptica
 HIM
 Serj Tankian
 Stam1na
 The 69 Eyes
 The Cult
 Volbeat
Day 2 – Sunday 8 August
 Alice Cooper
 Anthrax
 Iggy and the Stooges
 Insomnium
 Iron Maiden
 Mokoma
 Profane Omen
 Slayer

Sonisphere 2011
Sonisphere returned in 2011 with new venues in India, France and Italy but did not return to Romania. It also marked the first time that Metallica played in India. The first headliner announced for Knebworth, England was Slipknot.

UK
Sonisphere Knebworth took place from 8 to 10 July 2011. On 3 December 2010, it was announced that the American band Slipknot would headline Sonisphere 2011. Soon afterward, on 6 December it was announced that Scottish rock band Biffy Clyro would be headlining the Saturday night, in the band's first major festival headlining performance.
On 13 December 2010, it was announced that Metallica, Megadeth, Slayer and Anthrax would headline the Friday of the Knebworth event. This will be the first time that The Big Four perform together in the UK.
On 17 January 2011, it was announced that Motörhead, Mastodon, In Flames and Parkway Drive will be playing the UK leg of Sonisphere. On 31 January 2011, it was announced that Weezer, Airbourne, Architects and Diamond Head will be playing Sonisphere. On 28 February You Me at Six, All Time Low, Sum 41, House of Pain, Arch Enemy, Grinspoon, Fozzy and Periphery were added to the lineup. On 28 March Bill Bailey, Jarred Christmas, Jason John Whitehead, Jim Breuer, and Steve-O were added to the lineup. According to the official site, during all three days of event, nearly 190,000 people were present. Cancer Bats performed a Black Sabbath tribute show. Motörhead dedicated their set to their former guitarist Würzel who died just the day before.  The Saturday July 9 show opened at 11:30AM with a performance by Richard Cheese & Lounge Against The Machine.

Sweden
Sonisphere in Sweden returned to Stockholm, but it was held at "Globen Open Air" on Saturday 9 July 2011. Slipknot headlined the event, with In Flames, Mastodon, Mustasch and Dead by April also playing at the festival. Only 16,000 fans came to see the bands this time.

 Airbourne
 Arch Enemy
 Dead by April
 Graveyard
 In Flames
 Kvelertak
 Mastodon
 Mustasch
 Seventribe
 Slipknot

Finland

Sonisphere in Finland took place at Kalasatama, Helsinki on 2 July 2011. Slipknot headlined the bill with the other bands performing included: In Flames, Opeth, Sonata Arctica, HammerFall, Mastodon and more. As opposed to past two years, the 2011 Sonisphere was less well attended, with attendance of only 12,000 fans.

 Battle Beast
 HammerFall
 In Flames
 Mastodon
 Norther
 Opeth
 Poisonblack
 Slipknot
 Sonata Arctica
 Stam1na

Poland
Sonisphere Poland returned to Bemowo Airport, Warsaw on Friday 10 June 2011. Iron Maiden announced on their website that they would headline the event in Poland in 2011. Motörhead was confirmed as the second headliner of the festival. Other bands announced were Mastodon, Volbeat, Killing Joke, Devin Townsend, Hunter and Made of Hate. Iron Maiden played to the crowd of over 40,000 people who attended the event.

 Corruption 
 Devin Townsend Project
 Hunter
 Iron Maiden
 Killing Joke
 Made of Hate
 Mastodon
 Motörhead
 Volbeat

Greece
Sonisphere in Greece returned to Athens and it took place in Terra Vibe Park, Malakassa on Friday 17 June 2011. Iron Maiden headlined the event, and Slipknot were special guests, playing live for the first time since Paul Gray's death. Mastodon, Gojira and Virus were the supporting acts.  On 6 May it was announced that Nightfall, Moonspell, Need and Total Riot would play on 17 June 2011. Rotting Christ were the headliners of the second stage of the Greek leg of Sonisphere Festival. More than 25,000 fans attended the event.

Italy

Sonisphere 2011 took place on Italian soil for the first time. More than 40,000 people were present during two days of festival. The two-day event was booked at the Autodromo Enzo e Dino Ferrari in Imola, on 25 and 26 June 2011. Iron Maiden were the headliners on the first evening, and the band performed to nearly 30,000 fans. Next day's headliners were Linkin Park with 13,000 in attendance. The other bands on the bill were: Slipknot, My Chemical Romance, Sum 41, Alter Bridge, The Cult, Mastodon, Motörhead, Guano Apes, Funeral for a Friend, Papa Roach, Rob Zombie, Apocalyptica and many others.

France
Slipknot and The Big Four confirmed that they would be headlining the French Sonisphere event, which took place on 8 and 9 July 2011. Other bands announced were Dream Theater, Airbourne, Mastodon, Gojira, Loudblast, Tarja, Volbeat, Diamond Head, Mass Hysteria, Rise To Remain, Symphonia, Bring Me the Horizon and Papa Roach. The two nights attracted 76,000 people.
Metallica performed Helpless from Diamond Head, with Diamond Head and Anhrax members on stage, but without Slayer and Megadeth

India
On 1 May 2011, Metallica confirmed on their official website that they would headline the Indian edition of Sonisphere, which took place in Bangalore on 30 October at the Palace Grounds.

Spain
The third Spanish Sonisphere Festival took place on 15 and 16 July 2011, at Getafe Open Air in Madrid. The main headliner was Iron Maiden with The Darkness and Slash headlining the night before. Sonsphere Spain included around 70,000 attendees. Iron Maiden played to a full house venue with nearly 45,000 fans.

Turkey
Iron Maiden headlined the second Turkish Sonisphere show, which took place on 19 June 2011, at Maçka Küçükçiftlik Park, Istanbul. Other bands that played included Slipknot, Alice Cooper, Mastodon and In Flames. Tickets were sold to approximately 25,000 people.

Bulgaria
A Sonisphere event was scheduled to happen this year in Bulgaria but according to local promoter Marcel Avram and Balkan Entertainment the event was cancelled due to logistical and other problems that could not be rectified. The promoters also said that these problems were out of their control and that full refunds for tickets would begin on 15 June and continue to 15 July.

Switzerland
Sonisphere returned to Switzerland for the second time. The event took place at St. Jakob on 23 and 24 June in Basel. Over two evenings more than 35,000 people attended the headlining shows. 23 June headliner was Judas Priest with the Epitaph World Tour at the St. Jakobshalle; the next evening's headliner was Iron Maiden, who performed to almost 25,000 fans gathered at Leichtathletik Stadion. The other bands were: Whitesnake, Alice Cooper, Slipknot, Limp Bizkit, In Extremo, In Flames, Papa Roach, Kreator, Mr. Big, Hatebreed, HammerFall, Alter Bridge, Gojira, Gwar, Skindred and many more.

Czech Republic
For the second time, Sonisphere took place in Czech Republic. The 2011 event was originally scheduled for Milovice Airport, but after a few months was changed to Praha's Výstaviště Park. Nearly 30,000 people from Czech Republic and many other countries (Poland, Germany, Austria) attended the headlining gig of Iron Maiden on 11 June 2011. Other bands on the bill included The Sisters of Mercy, Kreator, Korn, Mastodon, Cavalera Conspiracy and many others.

Sonisphere 2012

UK

Sonisphere Knebworth was scheduled to take place from 6 to 8 July 2012. On 20 February 2012, the headliners were announced as Kiss (Friday), Queen + Adam Lambert (Saturday) and Faith No More (Sunday). Several bands were set to play an album in its entirety, including Mastodon performing The Hunter, Glassjaw performing Worship and Tribute and Hundred Reasons performing Ideas Above Our Station''. On 29 March the festival was cancelled with the organisers stating that co-ordinating the festival to an appropriate standard this year had proved more difficult than expected.

Poland
Poland hosted Sonisphere on 10 May 2012, at Bemowo Airport.
 Acid Drinkers
 Black Label Society
 Gojira
 Hunter
 Luxtorpeda
 Machine Head
 Metallica

Spain
Spain hosted Sonisphere on 25 and 26 May 2012, at Getafe Open Air.

Day 1 – Friday 25 May
 Corrosion of Conformity
 Kobra and the Lotus
 Kyuss Lives!
 Limp Bizkit
 Machine Head
 Orange Goblin
 Paradise Lost
 Rise to Remain
 Skindred
 Sonata Arctica
 Soundgarden
 The Offspring
Day 2 – Saturday 26 May
 Children of Bodom
 Clutch
 Enter Shikari
 Evanescence
 Fear Factory
 Ghost
 Gojira
 Mastodon
 Metallica
 Slayer
 Vita Imana
 Within Temptation

Switzerland
Switzerland held Sonisphere on 30 May 2012, at Yverdon-les-Bains.

 Eluveitie
 Gojira
 Mastodon
 Metallica
 Motörhead
 Slayer

Finland
Finland held Sonisphere on 4 June 2012, at Kalasatama.

 Amorphis
 Ghost
 Gojira
 Hardcore Superstar
 Machine Head
 Metallica

France
France held Sonisphere on 7 and 8 July 2012, at Amneville.

Sonisphere 2013

UK
In December 2012, organisers announced the festival would make a return after cancelling that year's edition in Knebworth. However, on 21 December it was confirmed the event would be cancelled for the second year in succession, citing a struggle to secure a strong lineup for the festival.

Sonisphere 2014

UK

It was announced on 12 November 2013, that Sonisphere would return to Knebworth, UK, from 4 to 6 July 2014. The festival would celebrate 40 years of Rock Music at Knebworth Park. Sonisphere would come to Hamburg, Germany on 4 June 2014.

On 2 December Iron Maiden (Saturday) and Metallica (Sunday) were announced as the first two headliners of the UK edition of Sonisphere. This would be Iron Maiden's final show of their highly successful Maiden England World Tour. It was also revealed when Metallica were announced, that fans booking weekend tickets would be eligible to vote for 17 of the 18 songs in Metallica's setlist (The 18th to be one of their new songs). On 11 December The Prodigy were announced to be headlining the Friday slot. On 6 January, Slayer, Mastodon, Alice in Chains, Ghost, Karnivool, Gojira and Airbourne were added to the lineup as undercard bookings. Then on 21 January, Limp Bizkit were revealed to be the special guests for The Prodigy on the Friday, with Dropkick Murphys, The Sisters Of Mercy, Anthrax, Chas & Dave, The Devin Townsend Project, Carniflex, Silverstein, The Virgin Marys, Voodoo Six, TessaracT and Alestorm also appearing across the weekend. The event would also see the United Kingdom debut of Japanese death metal group BABYMETAL, which was perhaps the most anticipated set in Sonisphere history. 

For the first time at a UK festival, the pro wrestling company Progress Wrestling held three shows at The Satellite Stage on all three days. The shows were well received and considered on many music sites "Best at Sonisphere 2014", especially after a "Lego Deathmatch" was held on the final night.

Sonisphere also later revealed on their official Facebook page, that they plan to continue their tradition of having no stage clashes between the two main stages (Apollo & Saturn stages), but the other stages would run as normal.

The capacity of the 2014 UK festival was 60,000.

Sonisphere 2015

Italy
Italy held Sonisphere on 2 June 2015, at Assago Summer Arena.
 Faith No More
 Gojira
 Hawk Eyes
 Meshuggah
 Metallica
 Three Days Grace
 We Are Harlot

Switzerland
Switzerland held Sonisphere on 6 June 2015, at ExpoPark Nidau-Biel.
 Bonaparte
 Incubus
 Muse
 The Hives

UK
Sonisphere UK 2015 was cancelled in January 2015 after the organisers stated they couldn't get a line-up together they deemed suitable for the event.

Sonisphere 2016

Switzerland
Switzerland held Sonisphere on 3 and 4 June 2016, at Allmend in Lucerne.

Day 1 – Friday 3 June
 Gojira
 Iron Maiden
 Sabaton
 The Raven Age
 The Wild Lies
 Tremonti

Day 2 – Saturday 4 June
 Anthrax
 Apocalyptica
 Powerwolf
 Rammstein
 Shakra
 Slayer
 The Shrine
 tuXedoo

UK
On 8 January the official Sonisphere Facebook page replied to a user, on a picture that they shared, stating: "We don't have a festival that I am aware of". Sonisphere did not take place in Knebworth despite organisers stating a desire to return.

See also 
 Concerts at Knebworth House
 The Final Frontier World Tour
 World Magnetic Tour
 Memorial World Tour

References

External links 

 
 Vexed Sonisphere Festival Coverage – Feat Interviews with Taking Back Sunday, The Used and more

Music festivals established in 2009
Rock festivals in the United Kingdom
Music festivals staged internationally
Heavy metal festivals in Europe
Rock festivals in England
Rock festivals in the Netherlands
Rock festivals in Finland
Rock festivals in Sweden
Rock festivals in Spain
Rock festivals in Germany
2009 establishments in Europe